"Costa Rica" is a single released by American record label Dreamville, performed by American rappers Bas and JID, featuring fellow American rappers Guapdad 4000, Reese Laflare, Jace of Two-9, Mez, Smokepurpp, Buddy, and Ski Mask the Slump God. It was released on July 1, 2019, along with "LamboTruck" as the third and fourth single from Dreamville's 2019 compilation album, Revenge of the Dreamers III.

Background
In February, Dreamville gave a live preview of the song at a free concert in Charlotte after the 2019 NBA All-Star Game. Under the EP ROTD3.COM. The single was released with "LamboTruck" on July 1. It is the most collaborated song on the album, with 9 artists featured on the song.

Recording and composition
The song was produced by Pyrex and Cubeatz. Guapdad 4000 said he was inspired to write the hook when he found fans and media impressions from Costa Rica on his social media. Bas said that the song was recorded with whoever was left in the studio during the sessions in Atlanta, saying the A room [at Tree Sound Studios] yielded a lot of "high-energy" songs "because it was the hub. Every day when you would pull up, it was the one big room that hosted a bunch of people, and then there are some more ducked off rooms if you wanted to get a more intimate session."

Critical reception
Writers of the HotNewHipHop staff ranked the song among their "30 best posse cuts of all time" saying, "while healthy competition can drive a posse cut to heightened levels of excellence, so too can the simple purity of camaraderie. Especially when substances are involved. The Revenge Of The Dreamers 3 sessions were legendary in that regard, bringing emcees of all walks of life into the studio for a two-weeks-long creative haven, culminating in no shortage of new music and friendships forged along the way. In many says, the bombastic “Costa Rica” feels like the heart of the Dreamers sessions, a gathering of like-minded emcees feeding off one another's energy during an extensive night of recording."

Commercial performance
"Costa Rica" peaked at number 75 on the US Billboard Hot 100. On December 18, 2019, the song was certified gold by the Recording Industry Association of America (RIAA).

Credits and personnel
Credits and personnel adapted from Tidal.

 Abbas Hamad – featured artist, composer, lyricist
 Destin Route – featured artist, composer, lyricist
 Guapdad 4000 – featured artist, composer, lyricist
 Reese LAFLARE – featured artist, composer, lyricist
 Jace – featured artist, composer, lyricist
 Mez – featured artist, composer, lyricist
 Smokepurpp – featured artist, composer, lyricist
 Buddy – featured artist, composer, lyricist
 Ski Mask the Slump God – featured artist, composer, lyricist
 Cubeatz – producer, composer, lyricist
 Pyrex – producer, composer, lyricist
 Joe LaPorta – mastering engineer
 Juru "Mez" Davis – mixer
 Miguel Scott – recording engineer

Charts

Certifications

References

2019 singles
2019 songs
Bas (rapper) songs
Dreamville Records singles
JID songs
Songs written by Bas (rapper)
Ski Mask the Slump God songs
Song recordings produced by Cubeatz
Songs written by JID
Songs written by Kevin Gomringer
Songs written by Smokepurpp
Songs written by Tim Gomringer
Smokepurpp songs